The National Agency for Energy Saving and Renewable Energy (NAERE) is a Russian non-governmental and non-commercial partnership established in 2009. It conducts projects varying from energy audits and technical solutions development to the installation and maintenance of energy efficient equipment. As of 2013 NAERE unites more than 60 Russian and foreign companies.

Purpose 
The purpose of the group is to bring together leading organizations in the field of energy efficiency to stimulate interest in rational use of energy resources.

Projects 
NAERE is experienced in implementing energy efficient projects at wide range of different facilities including:

 Public sector
 City infrastructure
 Industry
 Services and business sector and residential sector

Renewable energy in Russia
Environmental organizations based in Russia